The Jewish Economic Party was a political party of the First Czechoslovak Republic. It was created in October 1925 by Slovak Orthodox rabbis as a regional Slovakian party against the Zionist-controlled Jewish Party. It took part in the 1925 Czechoslovak parliamentary elections, where it got 16,861 votes (0.24%) and no seat.

Bibliography
Lenni Brenner, Zionism in the Age of the Dictators. A Reappraisal. (16. The Jewish Parties of Eastern Europe, Czechoslovakia – 2.4 Per Cent of an Empire), 1983
Kateřina Čapková, "Židovská Strana", in: YIVO Encyclopaedia, YIVO Institute for Jewish Research
Marie Crhová, “Jewish Politics in Central Europe: The Case of the Jewish Party in Interwar Czechoslovakia,” Jewish Studies at the CEU 2 (1999–2001)

Agudat Yisrael
Agrarian parties
Anti-Zionist political parties
Haredi anti-Zionism
Haredi Judaism in Europe
Interwar minority parties in Czechoslovakia
Jewish anti-Zionism in Europe
Jewish political parties
Jews and Judaism in Czechoslovakia
Political parties established in 1925
Orthodox Jewish political parties